Kenneth Malcolm Wharram (July 2, 1933 – January 10, 2017) was a Canadian professional ice hockey right winger who played 14 seasons in the National Hockey League, all with the Chicago Black Hawks, wearing number 17. He won a Stanley Cup in 1961.

Early life and career
Wharram started his hockey career with his hometown team the North Bay Black Hawks in 1949 before switching the next season to the Galt Black Hawks for whom he played three seasons. He played one match for the Galt team's parent club the Chicago Black Hawks in 1951 before returning for another season to Galt. He played 29 matches for the Hawks in 1953–54 but spent an equal amount of time at the Quebec Aces in the Quebec Hockey League before joining the American Hockey League Buffalo Bisons in 1954. Under the training of Bisons' coach Harry Watson he enjoyed four productive seasons, made the AHL's second all star team in 1955, and returned to Chicago to stay in 1958.

The Scooter Line
Wharram still seemed to struggle to find a spot on the Hawks until he was teamed on a line with Stan Mikita. Mikita and Wharram meshed well together and Wharram's production - attributable to his considerable speed and puck-handling skills - soared. He would have seven straight seasons scoring 20 or more goals.

All that was needed was a left winger, and the Hawks got one in veteran Ted Lindsay, then near the end of his career. It would be Lindsay, Mikita and Wharram who formed the original Scooter Line. After Lindsay retired, Ab McDonald assumed the honors, and it would be this version of the Scooter Line in force when the Hawks won the 1961 Stanley Cup. After McDonald was traded to the Boston Bruins, Doug Mohns was placed in the left wing spot.

Sudden retirement and death
Wharram was attending the Black Hawks' training camp on September 16, 1969, when he noticed he was having chest pains. He was quickly sent to a hospital intensive care unit where he was diagnosed with myocarditis. Wharram's condition worsened to the point where he needed to be trained how to stay awake. The process took weeks, and while Wharram's life was eventually out of danger, the stress of playing hockey made a comeback out of the question. He officially retired in September 1970 and settled down in North Bay as a carpenter. He was inducted to the North Bay Hall of Fame in 1980. Wharram died on January 10, 2017, at the age of 83.

Career statistics

References

Legends of Hockey article on Ken Wharram

External links
 

1933 births
2017 deaths
Canadian ice hockey right wingers
Chicago Blackhawks players
Galt Black Hawks players
Ice hockey people from Ontario
Lady Byng Memorial Trophy winners
Sportspeople from North Bay, Ontario
Stanley Cup champions